The 2015–16 Iraqi Premier League (known as the Fuchs Premier League for sponsorship reasons) was the 42nd season of the Iraqi Premier League since its establishment in 1974. The season started on 15 September 2015 and concluded on 22 May 2016.

Al-Zawraa won a record 13th Iraqi Premier League title, finishing one point ahead of defending champions Naft Al-Wasat. Al-Zawraa went through all 24 matches without a single defeat: the seventh time that a team has won the league undefeated since the league's inception in 1974.

Group stage

Group 1

Results

Group 2

Results

Elite stage
The Elite Stage started on 2 April and finished on 22 May. Each team played each other just once.

Results

Final positions

Top scorers

See also
 2015–16 Iraq FA Cup

References

External links
 Iraq Football Association

Iraqi Premier League seasons
1
Iraq